Qingkou railway station is a railway station located in Hubei Province, People's Republic of China, on the Yiwan Railway which is operated by China Railway Corporation.

Structure

Service

History
It's still under construction.

Nearby station

Railway stations in Hubei